The Azat is a river in the Kotayk Province of Armenia. Its source is on the western slope of the Geghama mountains. It flows through Garni, Lanjazat and Arevshat. It flows into the Aras near Artashat. The main purpose of the Azat dam is to serve for irrigation and hydro power generation. Its hazard potential is ranked to be high.

The Azat is known in Armenia for its beauty. It flows for 55 kilometers and has a basin that occupies 572 square kilometers. The Azat passes through the Khosrov State Reserve. In its lower reaches, the river flows into the Ararat valley. The Azat is known for its numerous spectacular waterfalls and its rock choked river bed.

Symphony of Stones
One section of the Azat, where it meets River Goght, is particularly fascinating. It is a canyon known as Canyon of Garni. The canyon's formation is so unique that it almost looks artificial. The canyon is composed of regular hexagonal prisms. Near its end, the gorge's beautiful formation has prompted the name "Symphony of Stones".

Gallery

See also
Geography of Armenia
List of rivers of Armenia
List of lakes of Armenia

References 

Rivers of Armenia